Arthur Turner may refer to:
Arthur Turner (politician) (born 1950), American politician
Arthur Turner (British Army officer) (1878–1952), English cricketer, rugby union player and soldier
Arthur Turner (bishop) (1862–1910), Anglican bishop in Korea
Arthur F. Turner, president of the Optical Society of America
Arthur Francis Turner (1912–1991), British naval officer
Arthur James Turner (1889–1971), British scientist in the field of textile technology
Arthur James Turner (politician) (1888–1983), politician in British Columbia, Canada
Arthur William Turner (1900–1989), Australian veterinary scientist and bacteriologist
Arthur Logan Turner (1865–1939), Scottish surgeon and medical author and historian

Sportspeople
Archie Turner (Arthur Turner, 1877–1925), Southampton and England footballer
Arthur Turner (Australian footballer) (1920–2005), Australian rules footballer for South Melbourne
Arthur Turner (footballer, born 1867) (1867–?), Small Heath forward
Arthur Turner (footballer, born 1909) (1909–1994), Stoke and Birmingham footballer, Birmingham City and Oxford United manager
Arthur Turner (footballer, born 1921) (1921–2019), Charlton Athletic and Colchester United centre forward
Arthur Turner (Tottenham Hotspur football manager) (died 1949), Tottenham Hotspur club secretary and manager
Arthur Turner (Norwich City football manager), former manager of English football club Norwich City